Robert Andrews Hill (March 25, 1811 – July 2, 1900) was a United States district judge of the United States District Court for the Northern District of Mississippi and the United States District Court for the Southern District of Mississippi.

Education and career

Born in Iredell Countny, North Carolina, Hill was the son of David Hill and Rhoda Andrews, and the grandson of Scottish-Irish forebears who had emigrated to Pennsylvania in the 18th century and later settled in North Carolina. Hill read law to enter the bar in 1844. He was a constable in Williamson County, Tennessee, from 1834 to 1836, and was then a Justice of Peace for the county until 1844. He was in private practice in Waynesboro, Tennessee from 1844 to 1847. He was a state district attorney general of Waynesboro from 1847 to 1855, thereafter resuming private practice in Jacinto, Mississippi, until 1858. He was a Judge of the Probate Court of Tishomingo County, Mississippi from 1858 to 1865, and was a district chancellor for the state of Mississippi from 1865 to 1866.

Federal judicial service

Hill was nominated by President Andrew Johnson on March 27, 1866, to a joint seat on the United States District Court for the Northern District of Mississippi and the United States District Court for the Southern District of Mississippi vacated by Judge Samuel J. Gholson. He was confirmed by the United States Senate on May 1, 1866, and received his commission the same day. His service terminated on August 1, 1891, due to his retirement.

Death

Hill died on July 2, 1900, in Oxford, Mississippi.

References

Sources
 

1811 births
1900 deaths
Judges of the United States District Court for the Southern District of Mississippi
Judges of the United States District Court for the Northern District of Mississippi
United States federal judges appointed by Andrew Johnson
19th-century American judges
People from Iredell County, North Carolina
People from Wayne County, Tennessee
People from Williamson County, Tennessee
19th-century American politicians
United States federal judges admitted to the practice of law by reading law